Fun Time was a Canadian children's television series which aired on CBC Television from 1956 to 1957.

Premise
The series featured Captain Frank (Frank Heron), his Fun Time Showboat and his parrot Matey. Episodes began with magic tricks by Magic Tom (Tom Auburn) or with juggling. Alan Jack and June Mack demonstrated how to play games and were featured with Captain Frank in various adventure segments filmed at various location. Traffic and water safety lessons were given by Elmer the Safety Elephant. The show's orchestra was led by Otto Muller.

Production
Fun Time was produced in Montreal.

Scheduling
This half-hour series aired Thursdays at 5:30 p.m. (Eastern) from 5 July to 27 September 1956, then Fridays at 5:00 p.m. from 5 October 1956 until the last broadcast on 1 February 1957.

References

External links
 

CBC Television original programming
1950s Canadian children's television series
1956 Canadian television series debuts
1957 Canadian television series endings
Black-and-white Canadian television shows
Television shows filmed in Montreal